Hunts Point may refer to:

 Hunts Point, Bronx, New York City, New York State, USA
 Hunts Point Avenue (IRT Pelham Line)
 Hunts Point station (Metro-North)
 Hunts Point Department of Public Safety
 Hunts Point Food Distribution Center, current home of the
 new Fulton Fish Market
 Hunts Point Cooperative Market (meat market)
 New York City Terminal Market (produce market)
 Hunts Point Hospital
 Hunts Point Riverside Park
 Hunts Point, Washington, USA
 Hunt's Point, Nova Scotia, Canada

See also

 Hunt (disambiguation)
 Point (disambiguation)